The University of California Botanical Garden is a 34-acre (13.7 ha) botanical garden located on the University of California, Berkeley campus, in Strawberry Canyon. The garden is in the Berkeley Hills, inside the city boundary of Oakland, with views overlooking the San Francisco Bay. It is one of the most diverse plant collections in the United States, and famous for its large number of rare and endangered species.

Description 
The garden was established in 1890 on the university's central campus. It was moved to its present location in the Berkeley Hills above the main campus under the directorship of Thomas Harper Goodspeed. The garden is about a mile from the Lawrence Hall of Science. The layout in Strawberry Canyon was designed by Goodspeed and fellow Berkeley professor and landscape architect, John William Gregg.

Collections 
The garden has more than 20,000 accessions, representing 324 plant families, 12,000 different species and subspecies, and 2,885 genera. Outdoor collections are, in general, arranged geographically and nearly all specimens were collected in the wild.

The major family collections include: cactus (2,669 plants), lily (1,193 plants), sunflower (1,151 plants), erica (897 plants), and orchid (950 plants). Other families include about 500 types of ferns and fern allies, Chinese medicinal herbs, plants of economic importance, old rose cultivars, and California native plants. Sets of greenhouses contain succulents, epiphytes, ferns, carnivorous plants, and tropicals.

Geographic layout 
The garden collections are geographically organized, and include:
South Africa
– featuring South African plants, including: lilies, Proteas, ice plants, Aloes, and Encephalartos.
Asia
— featuring a Rhododendron collection (259 taxa, 397 accessions), including many mature trees. (Rhododendrons too tender for most North American climates.)) Also present are specimens of the redwood family, including the original dawn redwoods (Metasequoia), and dozens of unusual shrubs, vines, and herbaceous species recently collected from China.
Australasia
– plants from Australia and New Zealand; with southern beeches, banksias, myrtles such as eucalyptus, cycads, and phormiums.
California Native
– over 4,000 accessions, including nearly one-half of the state's native vascular plant species and 174 taxa on the California Native Plant Society's list of rare and endangered species
–Prominent genera are: manzanitas (Arctostaphylos spp.) with 81 taxa (252 accessions), California-Lilacs (Ceanothus spp.) with 55 taxa (164 accessions), and an almost complete collection of California bulbous monocots in the Lily and Amaryllis families (Fritillaria, Calochortus, Lilium, Erythronium, Allium, Brodiaea) with 118 taxa (234 accessions)
Chinese Medicinal Herb Garden
– selections from the pharmacopeia of modern China.

Mediterranean
– exhibits flora from the region's countries, including: Morocco, Spain, Portugal, the Canary Islands, Turkey, and Syria, on a hillside with views across the San Francisco Bay.
Deserts of the Americas

– bristles with cacti and other succulents from North and Central America, plus the high deserts of the Andes.
 Eastern North America
– includes deciduous trees such as tulip tree (Liriodendron), bald cypress (Taxodium), and dogwoods (Cornus).
 Meso American
– shows the diversity of Central American habitats with genera found in both mountain and desert areas such as Agaves, oaks (Quercus), pines, and a range of brightly flowered Salvias.
 South America
– with a grove of monkey puzzle trees (Araucaria araucana), a collection of fuchsias, and several species of southern beech. The garden also has a selection of cultivars of Lapageria.

Greenhouses
The garden's greenhouses include:
 the Arid House, presenting seasonal exhibits of cacti and succulents.
 the fern and carnivorous plants house display diverse ferns and unusual insect-eating plants.
 the tropical house (currently being renovated) features tropical plants of economic value, and many curiosities such as the giant corpse lily Amorphophallus.

See also 
 List of California native plants
 List of botanical gardens in the United States

References

External links 

 
 

Botanical gardens in California
Botanic
Berkeley Hills
Parks in Oakland, California
Tourist attractions in Alameda County, California